Richard Grandpierre is a French film producer.

Filmography
 La Vengeance d'une blonde, (1994)
 Comme un aimant, (2000)
 Brotherhood of the Wolf, (2001)
 Love Bites, (2001)
 Irréversible, (2002)
 Cash Truck, (2004)
 Saint Ange, (2004)
 Masai: The Rain Warriors, (2004)
 Locked Out, (2006)
 Them, (2006)
 Dante 01, (2008)
 Martyrs, (2008)
 Safari, (2009)
 Safari: Hors Piste, (2009)
 The Italian, (2010)
 Monsieur Papa, (2011)
 Les Tuche, (2011)
 Happiness Never Comes Alone, (2012)
 Mes héros, (2012)
 Zulu, (2013)
 Beauty and the Beast, (2014)
 On a marché sur Bangkok, (2014)
 Entre amis, (2015)
 Ice and the Sky, (2015)
 Les Tuche 2, (2016)
 Marseille, (2016)
 Le doudou, (2018)
 Les Tuche 3, (2018)
 Climax, (2018)
 Just a Gigolo, (2019)
 Rendez-vous chez les Malawas, (2019)
 Mon Cousin, (2019)
 Bigbug, (2022)
 Gentleman Cambrioleur, (upcoming)

References

French film producers
Living people
Year of birth missing (living people)